Abraham Okyere (born 6 July 2002) is a Ghanaian professional footballer who plays as midfielder for Belgian First Division A side K Beerschot VA. He previously played for Ghanaian Premier League side International Allies F.C.

Career 
Okyere started his career with Ghanaian club International Allies in 2018 moving through the ranks till he was promoted to the senior team. He made his debut during the 2019 2019 GFA Normalization Committee Special Competition. On 22 June 2021, Okyere signed for Belgian First Division A side K Beerschot VA on a 2-year deal.

References

External links 

 
 

Living people
2002 births
Association football midfielders
Ghanaian footballers
International Allies F.C. players
K Beerschot VA players
Ghana Premier League players
Belgian Pro League players